Long'an or variant may refer to:

Places in China

Towns
Long'an, Luocheng County (龙岸镇), town in Luocheng Mulao Autonomous County, Guangxi
Written as "龙安镇":
Long'an, Jiangxi, town in Lichuan County
Long'an, Xingye County, a town in Guangxi
Long'an, Pingwu County, town in Sichuan

Townships
Long'an Township, Sichuan (龙安乡), a township in Guang'an District, Guang'an
Long'an Township (龙安乡), in Yiliang County, Zhaotong

Other places
Long'an County (隆安县), Guangxi
Long'an District (龙安区), Anyang, Henan

Other uses
 Longan, an Asian fruit
 Long An Province, Vietnam
 Long An F.C., soccer club in Vietnam
 Long An Stadium, multipurpose stadium in Tân An, Long An, Vietnam

See also
 Long (disambiguation)
 AN (disambiguation)